The 2022–23 South Pacific cyclone season is the period of the year when most tropical cyclones form within the South Pacific Ocean to the east of 160°E. The season officially started on November 1, 2022, and will end on April 30, 2023, however a tropical cyclone could form at any time between July 1, 2022, and June 30, 2023, and would count towards the season total. During the season, tropical cyclones will be officially monitored by the Fiji Meteorological Service, Australian Bureau of Meteorology and New Zealand's MetService. The United States Armed Forces through the Joint Typhoon Warning Center (JTWC) will also monitor the basin and issue unofficial warnings for American interests. The FMS attaches a number and an F suffix to tropical disturbances that form in or move into the basin while the JTWC designates significant tropical cyclones with a number and a P suffix. The BoM, FMS and MetService all use the Australian Tropical Cyclone Intensity Scale and estimate windspeeds with a period of approximately ten minutes, while the JTWC estimates sustained winds over a 1-minute period, which are subsequently compared to the Saffir–Simpson hurricane wind scale (SSHWS).


Seasonal forecasts

During July 2022, the Centre for Water, Climate and Land (CWCL) at Australia's Newcastle University, issued its first long-range tropical cyclone outlook for the 2022–23 season. Within the outlook, the CWCL took into account the persistent La Niña like conditions across the Tropical Pacific Ocean, that were expected to continue and the modelled sea surface temperatures over the Indian Ocean, which pointed towards a negative Indian Ocean Dipole event occurring. As a result, they predicted that the South Pacific region between 135°E and 120°W, would see a near-normal tropical cyclone season, with between six and nine tropical cyclones occurring during the season. 

They also predicted that French Polynesia, Niue, Northern New Zealand, Papua New Guinea, Tokelau, Tonga, Tuvalu, Wallis & Futuna, the Cook, Samoan and Pitcairn Islands, had a below normal of being impacted by a tropical cyclone. Fiji, New Caledonia and the Solomon Islands were thought to have a near-normal chance of being impacted by one or more tropical cyclones, while Vanuatu was expected to face an above-normal chance of being impacted by one or more tropical cyclones. The CWCL subsequently updated its forecast during August and predicted that the Solomon Islands and Vanuatu, would face a below-normal risk of being impacted by one or more tropical cyclones. They also predicted that Papua New Guinea now faced an above-average chance of being impacted by one or more tropical cyclones. During October, the CWCL issued their final outlook before the cyclone season started and noted that the Solomon Islands, Northern New Zealand and Vanuatu, now faced a near-normal risk of being impacted by one or more tropical cyclones.

New Zealand's National Institute of Water and Atmospheric Research (NIWA) subsequently published the Southwest Pacific Tropical Cyclone Outlook, which took into account CWCL's tropical cyclone outlooks, as well as the El Niño-Southern Oscillation conditions that were present over the basin and forecast to occur during the season. The outlook called for a near-average number of tropical cyclones for the 2022–23 season, with six to ten named tropical cyclones, predicted to occur between 135°E and 120°W, compared to an average of just under 9. Three or four of the tropical cyclones were expected to intensify further and become severe tropical cyclones, while it was noted that a Category 5 severe tropical cyclone could occur during the season.

The BoM issued two seasonal forecasts for the Southern Pacific Ocean, for their self-defined eastern and western regions of the South Pacific Ocean. They predicted that the Western region between 142.5°E and 165°E, had a 65% chance of seeing more than 4 tropical cyclones, while the Eastern Region between 165°E and 120°W, had a 43% chance of seeing more than 6 tropical cyclones.

Seasonal summary

Systems

Tropical Depression 01F

On December 10, the FMS reported that Tropical Disturbance 01F had developed, within an area of low vertical windshear near Fiji's southern Lau Islands. Moving southward under a moderate sheared environment with warm sea surface temperatures, 01F intensified into a tropical depression late on December 11, before being steered into a highly sheared environment due to an upper ridge to its north and an approaching upper trough from its west. It later moved into TCWC Wellington's area of responsibility, where it was reclassified as a deepening non-tropical low. It was last noted on December 13, near New Zealand.

Tropical Disturbance 02F

Late on December 29, the FMS reported that Tropical Disturbance 02F had developed to the south of Vanuatu. The JTWC gave it a low chance for development due to the system having a fully obscured LLC and in a favorable environment of low wind shear, good poleward outflow and warm sea surface temperatures. At 3:00 UTC on December 30, the JTWC announced that the system had transitioned into a subtropical cyclone, however the agency gave the system a low chance to develop into tropical cyclone due to persistent unfavorable environment. The system then moved into TCWC Wellington's area of responsibility on the next day, where it was reclassified as a non-tropical low.

Tropical Disturbance 03F

Late on January 5, the FMS reported that Tropical Disturbance 03F had formed near New Caledonia. The system generally moved southeast before the FMS ceased advisories on the system, on January 7. However, on January 8, the JTWC gave the system's chance for development, although in favorable environment, as low since it was in close proximity with Hale. But upon reanalysis, convection re-fired, and an eye feature was visible, although the JTWC later reported that the system had dissipated the following day.

Tropical Cyclone Hale

On January 7, Tropical Low 07U moved into the basin from the Australian region, when it was immediately reclassified as Tropical Depression 04F by the FMS. Late on the same day, it intensified into a Category 1 tropical cyclone, with the FMS naming it as Hale. At that time, the storm was feeling the effects of moderate wind shear, with its convective structure splitting into two different regions, before it started to weaken as shear increased and its low-level center became elongated. The FMS issued their last advisory on Hale by the next day as it moved east-southeast towards the TCWC Wellington's area of responsibility, where they reclassified it as an extratropical low six hours later. The JTWC subsequently discontinued warnings on the system three hours later.

In preparation for Hale, MetService issued heavy rain and wind warnings for many parts of New Zealand. A state of emergency was later declared in the northeastern part of New Zealand as it approached the country. Hale caused  widespread flooding and slips in northern and eastern parts of the country on January 10 and 11, particularly in the Coromandel and Gisborne areas. Washed away forestry slash clogged many rivers in the Gisborne region, exacerbating the flooding and accumulating around bridges downstream. Several metres of foreshore was eroded away by the storm surge in Whitianga, threatening waterfront buildings such as the Mercury Bay Boating Club. A child was killed on Waikanae Beach on January 25, two weeks after Hale impacted the country, after falling while playing on forestry slash debris left behind by the cyclone.

Tropical Cyclone Irene

By early January 13, the FMS noted that a low pressure system was expected to develop to the west of Vanuatu in the next 5 days, and gave it a moderate chance of development. However, the low formed in the Australian region late on the same day, and by January 14, it organized into a tropical disturbance, with the FMS designating it as 05F. 05F briefly entered the basin by the next day, before subsequently moving back to the Australian region late by the same day. 

By January 17, 05F moved back into the South Pacific basin, where it was upgraded to a tropical depression by the FMS. At 03:00 UTC on January 18, the JTWC's began issuing warnings on the system, classifying it as Tropical Cyclone 09P. The FMS subsequently followed suit, upgrading the system into a Category 1 tropical cyclone on the Australian scale and naming it Irene. At that time, satellite imagery showed Irene was quickly developing a central dense overcast (CDO). Under a favorable environment of warm sea surface temperatures, low wind shear and strong poleward outflow, Irene intensified into a Category 2 tropical cyclone late on the same day. However, as it moved over Tanna Island in Vanuatu, its weakly-defined and elongated low-level circulation center quickly became exposed due to the wind shear, prompting the JTWC to issue its final warning on Irene and reclassify the system as a subtropical cyclone by January 19. The FMS subsequently downgraded Irene into a Category 1 tropical cyclone, and continued to issue warnings as it weakened while moving east-southeast, before declaring the system an extratropical cyclone late on the same day. Irene was last noted the next day.

A heavy rain alert was issued for some parts of Fiji and the public was advised to be on high alert. Similar warnings were also issued to Vanuatu. On January 19, Irene caused flooding and power cuts in Port Villa.

Tropical Depression 06F

On January 20, a tropical low entered the basin from the Australian region, where the FMS immediately designated the system as Tropical Depression 06F. Later on the same day, the JTWC upgraded the system into a tropical storm, and designating it as Tropical Cyclone 10P, although the system was becoming exposed due to a dry air infiltration. With the system becoming fully exposed due to increasing wind shear and large amounts of dry air, the JTWC issued their final advisory on 06F the next day. The FMS continued to issue advisories on 06F as it continued east-southeast, before turning south-southwest and weakening into a low pressure area by January 22. The remnants of the system impacted New Zealand on January 27, causing severe flooding and killing 4 people.

Severe Tropical Cyclone Gabrielle

 
On February 10, Severe Tropical Cyclone Gabrielle moved into the basin from the Australian region, as a Category 3 severe tropical cyclone on the Australian scale. Gabrielle began to experience an increase in northwesterly vertical wind shear, the JTWC downgraded it to a Category 1-equivalent cyclone. Later that day, Gabrielle moved into MetService's area of responsibility. By 21:00 UTC, the low-level circulation became fully exposed on the central convection, the JTWC  discontinued warnings on the system. Later the next day, Gabrielle was downgraded to a Category 2 tropical cyclone by the MetService. Gabrielle subsequently passed directly over Norfolk Island. The BoM and MetService reported that Gabrielle had transitoned into a deep subtropical low later that day. The JTWC classified it as a subtropical storm.

Weather warnings were issued across Norfolk Island and New Zealand, with multiple states of emergency being declared in New Zealand as the cyclone impacted the country. Heavy rain and strong winds led to widespread power outages and flooding across the upper North Island, with a national state of emergency being declared on February 14. Two people were killed in Muriwai, while eight others were killed in Hawke's Bay, and one person killed in Gisborne. New Zealand declared a national state of emergency for the third time in its history on February 14 as Cyclone Gabrielle caused widespread flooding, landslides and huge ocean swells.

Severe Tropical Cyclone Judy

 
On February 22, the FMS reported that a low-pressure system was located just south of Samoa, and gave it a low chance of formation into a tropical cyclone in the next 5 days. Under a moderate sheared environment and warm sea surface temperatures, the system organized into a tropical disturbance late on the next day, with the FMS designating it as 08F. The disturbance steered southwest from a subtropical ridge on February 26 after upgrading to a tropical depression. During February 26, the JTWC issued a Tropical Cyclone Formation Alert (TCFA) on the system. The system was upgraded to a Category 1 tropical cyclone and attained the name Judy from the FMS after improved organization the same day. The JTWC also upgraded the system to Tropical Cyclone on February 27, initiating advisories on it as Tropical Cyclone 15P. Judy eventually became a Category 4 on the Australian scale and Category 3 on the SSHWS. The system began to weaken as it headed southeastward, entering the area of responsibility of the MetService. The JTWC issued their last warning on the system on March 3 as it transitioned to a subtropical cyclone. At the same time, the MetService had downgraded the system to Category 2 tropical cyclone status. It later became an extratropical cyclone by the next day.

Severe Tropical Cyclone Kevin

Tropical Low 18U entered the basin on March 1 where it became designated as Tropical Depression 09F by the FMS. The JTWC classified it as a Tropical Storm, initiating advisories as Tropical Cyclone 16P. The system was assigned the name Kevin by the FMS as it strengthened into a Category 1 tropical cyclone on the Australian scale. It later intensified to a Category 2 as it headed southeastward. On March 3, it became a Category 3 severe tropical cyclone on the Australian scale and a Category 1-equivalent tropical cyclone on the SSHWS. It rapidly intensified to a Category 5 tropical cyclone on both the Australian scale and the SSHWS on March 4. It began to steadily weaken as it headed southeastward, entering the area of responsibility of the MetService. It eventually became extratropical on March 6.

A heavy rain alert was issued for the Northern parts of Lautoka and Ba area, interior of Ba and Nadroga-Navosa, Sigatoka, and Kadavu.

Tropical Disturbance 10F

Late on March 8, the FMS reported that Tropical Disturbance 10F formed near Niue, and gave the system a low chance for development. The JTWC began tracking the disturbance by the next day, and also gave it a low chance of formation. Under an environment of warm sea surface temperatures, low to moderate wind shear, and excellent upper-level outflow, the system rapidly developed, prompting the JTWC to issue a TCFA late on the same day. By the next day, the FMS upgraded its formation chance to moderate. However, the system's low-level circulation became elongated and weakly-defined, with its convection being sheared to the east, prompting the JTWC to cancel its TCFA late on March 11. The FMS continued to track 10F until it was last noted two days later, to the southwest of Papeete, French Polynesia.

Tropical Disturbance 11F

On March 11, the FMS reported that Tropical Disturbance 11F had developed, within an environment of warm sea surface temperatures, low wind shear and moderate upper divergence, to the west of Tonga. The agency gave the system a moderate chance to develop further. The JTWC, meanwhile, had issued a TCFA on March 13. However, a day later the agency canceled the TCFA, due to the system entering unfavorable environment. The FMS, meanwhile, downgraded the system's chance for development to low, for the same reason. The JTWC reissued its TCFC and reupgraded the chance of the system becoming a cyclone to high. Under high vertical wind sheer, the JTWC canceled the TCFA again and redowngraded its chance of the system becoming a cyclone to low.

Tropical Disturbance 12F

Late on March 11, the FMS reported that Tropical Disturbance 12F had developed, within an environment of warm sea surface temperatures, low wind shear and good upper divergence, to the northeast of Vanuatu. The JTWC was also monitoring the disturbance, by the identifier code Invest 90P. They gave the system's chance for development as low, however on March 16, stopped tracking the system due to the system's convective activity reportedly dissipating.

Other system

On March 7, SENAMHI reported an "unorganized tropical cyclone". SENAMHI researchers were able to identify the formation of the cyclone at the end of February, and also stated that the unusual phenomenon would remain in the Peruvian sea but would not affect any cities on the Peruvian and Ecuadorian coasts. They also reported that moderate to heavy rainfall would develop on the northern coast and highlands of Peru from March 9 to March 11. and that the cyclone would not become a hurricane. The system was named "Cyclone Yaku", with the word "Yaku" coming from the Quechuan translation of "water".

On March 10, the National Institute of Meteorology and Hydrology (INAMHI) in Ecuador reported that Yaku was moving away from Ecuador and would no longer have a direct impact on the country. In Peru, it was predicted that precipitation from the event would last through mid-March while precipitation from warm sea temperatures would occur into April.

Storm names

With tropical depressions intensifying into a tropical cyclone between the Equator and 25°S and between 160°E - 120°W named by the FMS. However should a tropical depression intensify to the south of 25°S between 160°E and 120°W it will be named in conjunction with the FMS by MetService. Should a tropical cyclone move out of the basin and into the Australian region it will retain its original name. The next 10 names on the naming list are listed here below.

If a tropical cyclone enters the South Pacific basin from the Australian region basin (west of 160°E), it will retain the name assigned to it by the BoM. The following storms were named in this manner:

 Gabrielle

Season effects
This table lists all the storms that developed in the South Pacific to the east of longitude 160°E during the 2022–23 season. It includes their intensity on the Australian tropical cyclone intensity scale, duration, name, landfalls, deaths, and damages. All data is taken from RSMC Nadi and/or TCWC Wellington, and all of the damage figures are in 2022 or 2023 USD.

|-

See also

Weather of 2022 and 2023
List of Southern Hemisphere cyclone seasons
Tropical cyclones in 2022 and 2023
Atlantic hurricane seasons: 2022, 2023
Pacific hurricane seasons: 2022, 2023
Pacific typhoon seasons: 2022, 2023
North Indian Ocean cyclone seasons: 2022, 2023
2022–23 South-West Indian Ocean cyclone season
2022–23 Australian region cyclone season

References

External links

 
South Pacific cyclone seasons